This is a selected list of massively multiplayer online first-person shooter games. MMOFPSs are large multi-user games that take place in perpetual online worlds with hundreds or thousands of other players.

List of notable MMOFPSs

Business models

MMOFPSs today use a wide range of business models, from completely free of charge (no strings attached) or advertise funded to various kinds of payment plans. This list uses the following terms.
Free-to-play (F2P) means that there might be a cost to purchase the software but there is no subscription charge or added payments needed to access game content.
Pay-to-play means that players must pay, usually by monthly subscription, in order to play the game.
Freemium means that the majority of game content is available for free but players can pay for extra content or added perks.

See also
Online game
Lists of video games

References

massively multiplayer online first-person shooter games